Simon Lightbody is an Australian cricket umpire. He was promoted to the National Umpiring Panel for the 2017–18 cricket season. He has stood in domestic matches in the 2017–18 Sheffield Shield season and the 2017–18 JLT One-Day Cup.

References

External links
 

Year of birth missing (living people)
Living people
Australian cricket umpires
Place of birth missing (living people)